Steven Salaita (born ) is an American scholar, author and public speaker. He became the center of a controversy when the University of Illinois did not hire him as a professor of American Indian Studies following objections to a series of tweets critical of Israel's bombardment of Gaza in 2014. He also experienced similar controversy during the hiring process at the American University of Beirut in 2016.

Early life and education
Salaita was born in Bluefield, West Virginia, on September 15, 1975, to Hispanic and Arab immigrant parents. His mother was born and raised in Nicaragua by Palestinian parents who originated in Beit Jala. He describes his own ethnic background as both Jordanian and Palestinian. Salaita's father was from Madaba, Jordan. His maternal grandmother lost her home in Ayn Karim outside of Jerusalem in 1948.

Salaita received his B.A. in political science from Radford University in 1997 and his M.A. in English from Radford in 1999. He completed his Ph.D. at the University of Oklahoma in Native American studies with a literature emphasis.

Career
Following completion of his Ph.D., Salaita became an assistant professor of English at University of Wisconsin-Whitewater, where he taught American and ethnic American literature until 2006. He was then hired as associate professor of English at Virginia Tech, and received tenure three years later. In addition to teaching English courses, Salaita wrote about themes of immigration, indigenous peoples, dislocation, race, ethnicity and multi-culturalism. Michael Hiltzik of the Los Angeles Times refers to him as a "respected scholar in American Indian studies and Israeli-Arab relations."

Salaita won a 2007 Gustavus Myers Outstanding Book Award for writing the book Anti-Arab Racism in the USA: Where It Comes from and What it Means for Politics Today. The Gustavus Myers Center for the Study of Bigotry and Human Rights recognized Salaita's book as one that extends "our understanding of the root causes of bigotry and the range of options we as humans have in constructing alternative ways to share power." Miriam Cooke, professor at Duke University, described the book as "a sobering analysis of anti-Arab racism, from neo-conservative to liberal, rooted in America's settler colonial past and seeping into every corner of our lives. Steven Salaita takes the reader into the crisis of Arab-American communities in the wake of September 11. Written with passion, this lucid account of the dangers of American imperialism paints a dark picture of the agenda of the Bush administration not only in the Arab world but also for people of color at home."

Sinan Antoon, assistant professor at New York University, reviewed Salaita's book, The Holy Land in Transit: Colonialism and the Quest for Canaan, published in 2006. He found the author's comparative approach to Palestinian and Native American writers and the influence of politics on their production "refreshing". He found the strongest chapter to be the one devoted to Salaita's personal experience of spending the summer of 2002 in the Shatila refugee camp, where he introduced Native American studies to the residents and developed perspectives on how "alternative narratives can broaden the consciousness of decolonial advocates." Antoon notes that Salaita limited his scope to prose and limited Palestinian literature to English translations.

In 2014, Salaita received an appointment to begin a professorship in American Indian Studies at the University of Illinois. Just days before he was to start the role, he got notified that the University had 'cancelled' the offer, as detailed in the section "University of Illinois hiring controversy" below.

In July 2015, Salaita announced he had accepted the Edward W. Said Chair of American Studies at the American University of Beirut, and would begin his assignment in the fall of 2015. The university did not renew his position due to some inconsistencies in his hiring. The university stated it was due to "procedural irregularities."

In 2017, Salaita announced that he is leaving academia because no institution would hire him for full-time work. As of February 2019, he is a school bus driver in suburban Washington, D.C.

Controversies

Virginia Tech "Support our Troops" controversy
While teaching at Virginia Tech in 2013 Salaita became the center of controversy after writing an article in which he explained his refusal to endorse the "Support our Troops" slogan. Salaita stated that "In recent years I've grown fatigued of appeals on behalf of the troops, which intensify in proportion to the belligerence or potential unpopularity of the imperial adventure du jour". He criticized what he called "unthinking patriotism".

Reactions to his article were varied. A university spokesman, Lawrence G. Hincker, Associate Vice President for University Relations, said that the university supported Salaita's freedom of speech, but added: "While our assistant professor may have a megaphone on salon.com, his opinions not only do not reflect institutional position, we are confident they do not remotely reflect the collective opinion of the greater university community". Almost 40 Virginia Tech professors signed a letter protesting Hincker's comments in a letter to the student newspaper, the Collegiate Times. Faculty members criticized the university's statement as "wholly unsatisfactory" and "placing in doubt its commitment to academic freedom."

Commenting on Salaita's views and the surrounding controversy, Greg Scholtz, of the American Association of University Professors, noted that "[u]pholding academic freedom can be a difficult and even embarrassing," but "the most reputable institutions give the most latitude."

University of Illinois hiring controversy

In October 2013, Salaita was offered tenure in the American Indian studies program at University of Illinois, which he accepted, and he was scheduled to begin in August 2014. In July 2014, the two-month-long Gaza war broke out in which Israel conducted over 5,226 airstrikes in Gaza, killing over 2,000 Palestinians. Salaita posted hundreds of tweets criticizing Israel and its actions in Gaza. Some of the tweets angered pro-Israel students, faculty, and financial donors, who accused Salaita of anti-Semitism for rhetoric including "Zionists: transforming 'anti-Semitism' from something horrible into something honorable since 1948". University Chancellor Phyllis Wise told Salaita that he would not get the job, so he sued the university. During the legal proceedings, the university was forced to release hundreds of emails relating to his case which revealed that Wise had come under immense pressure to rescind Salaita's offer from wealthy donors. She resigned from her position as Chancellor after it was discovered that she had hidden emails from FOIA requests regarding the Steven Salaita hiring controversy. The university settled with Salaita for $875,000 in November 2015.

Salaita wrote about his experience in his book Inter/Nationalism: Decolonizing Native America and Palestine, in which he tackled the controversy from the perspective of decolonizing academic scholarship. He has supported an academic boycott of Israel and is a member of the organization US Campaign for the Academic and Cultural Boycott of Israel (USACBI).

American University of Beirut hiring controversy 
During Salaita's time at the American University of Beirut (AUB), the hiring process for director of the Center for American Studies and Research (CASAR) had still been ongoing in the spring semester of 2016. Salaita had been unanimously recommended for the position by the hiring committee and chair, Lisa Hajjar. When Fadlo Khuri, president of AUB, had abruptly canceled the search for director, this sparked outrage from both colleagues and students alike. Students and supporters had begun circulating an anonymous petition following Khuri's decision stating that "given Professor Salaita's recent termination from a tenure-track position at the University of Illinois at Urbana-Champaign for his pro-Palestinian political views, we fear that AUB is reproducing the trend of persecuting scholars who condemn the injustices committed in Palestine. This breach of academic freedom cannot be allowed at AUB." Lisa Hajjar, Edward Said Chair of American Studies at AUB and chair of the search committee for the director's job, had been quoted saying to an online publication: "the day after the recommendation of Salaita for the position was discussed at the Faculty of Arts and Sciences Advisory Committee, the dean informed the search committee that the president had canceled the search due to procedural irregularities. It is not clear to me which procedures were allegedly violated. I had been working quietly with AUB faculty to see if we could get a reversal of the cancellation, but the situation went public when students made a petition and posted it." Fadlo Khuri responded to these claims from university faculty and staff by saying these were "wholly untrue." Khuri went on to say that he acted after university leaders "received several complaints from faculty members alleging conflicts of interest and misconduct" in the search process. "Violations included the presence of visiting faculty with selection and voting rights on the search committee, as well as the presence of lower-ranked faculty members voting for a higher-ranked position. Additionally, there was a conflict implied by the current incumbent chairing a committee to find their own successor."

Steven Salaita has since left academia with no plans to turn back.

Books
Anti-Arab Racism in the USA: Where it Comes From and What it Means for Politics (2006) – Winner of 2007 Gustavus Myers Center for the Study of Bigotry and Human Rights' "Outstanding Book" Award.
The Holy Land in Transit: Colonialism and the Quest for Canaan (2006)
Arab American Literary Fictions Cultures and Politics (2007)
The Uncultured Wars (2008)
Modern Arab American Fiction: A Reader's Guide (2011)
Israel's Dead Soul (2011)
Uncivil Rites (2015)
Inter/Nationalism: Decolonizing Native America and Palestine (2016)

References

External links

 'I Am No anti-Semite' Says Steven Salaita, Lecturer-cum Celeb Who Was Fired for Tweeting, December 5, 2014. Neta Alexander. Haaretz
 The holy land in transit: colonialism and the quest for Canaan, PhD dissertation, 2003. Steven Salaita, University of Oklahoma.

21st-century American writers
American male writers
American writers of Palestinian descent
American people of Jordanian descent
Living people
University of Oklahoma alumni
1975 births
People from Bluefield, West Virginia
Palestinian Christians
Radford University alumni
University of Wisconsin–Whitewater faculty
Virginia Tech faculty